Peter Conrad may refer to:

 Pete Conrad (1930–1999), United States astronaut
 Peter Conrad (academic) (born 1948), Australian academic long resident in the United Kingdom
 Peter Conrad (sociologist) (born 1945), American academic, author, and professor at Brandeis University

See also
 Peter Conradi (born 1960), British author and journalist who is Deputy Foreign Editor of the Sunday Times
 Peter J. Conradi (born 1945), British author, journalist, and biographer